Luis Lamas was the mayor of the Argentine city of Rosario, Santa Fe Province, from 21 February 1898 to 19 February 1904.

He was grandson of Uruguayan politician and patriot Luis María Lamas.

During the Lamas administration the city grew considerably in population (by more than one third between the 1900 and 1906 censuses) and gained infrastructure and luxury. New streets were opened and older ones were paved. In 1900 Lamas authorized the construction of the Parque de la Independencia, a large urban park designed by famed landscape architect Carlos Thays, which was inaugurated two years later.

Also in 1902, the foundation stone of the modern port of Rosario was laid, as works were initiated to clean up the ravine of the Paraná River and to build a new coastal avenue. Lamas also dictated the beginning of the works for the Central Market, and created the first commission that proposed to build a National Flag Memorial.

In 1900, the municipal administration dictated regulations that allowed for legal prostitution, mandating the inscription of sex workers in a recording office, with the requirements of being 18 or older, working only in authorized facilities, having two medical examinations per week, and keeping an updated sanitary card with a picture, as well as forbidding public exhibition. In 1902 a new regulation included the waitresses in certain types of bars, to avoid clandestine unrecorded prostitution.

References
  Municipality of Rosario. List of mayors
  Asociación Familia Molisana de Rosario. History of Rosario.
  La Capital. 21 Sep 2003. Las fantasías y los espacios de placer en la ciudad de ayer.
  La Capital. 21 Feb 2004. Rosario desconocida: Un siglo de esplendor.

Year of birth missing
Year of death missing
Rosario, Santa Fe
Mayors of Rosario, Santa Fe
Place of birth missing